The yellow-breasted bunting (Emberiza aureola) is a passerine bird in the bunting family Emberizidae that is found across the Boreal and East Palearctic. The genus name Emberiza is from Old German Embritz, a bunting. The specific aureola is Latin for "golden". The bird's call is a distinctive zick, and the song is a clear tru-tru, tri-tri.

Until 2004, the International Union for Conservation of Nature considered the yellow-breasted bunting to be a species of least concern. Since 2004, it has been gradually upgraded to a status of Critically Endangered due to rapid drops in population sizes. It is subject to heavy hunting pressure in China, through which most specimens pass during migration.

Description 
For a bunting, it is large and rather stocky.

The breeding male has bright yellow underparts with black flank streaks, brown upperparts, black face and throat bar, and a pink lower mandible. The female has a heavily streaked grey-brown back, and less intensely yellow underparts.  She has a whitish face with dark crown, eye and cheek stripes. The juvenile is similar, but the background colour of the underparts and face is buff.

Distribution and habitat 
Emberiza aureola aureola breeds in boreal forests of Finland to Bering Sea migrating to Indochina. Emberiza aureola ornata breeds from the Amur River to Manchuria, N Korea, Kamchatka and Kuril Islands. It is migratory, wintering in south-east Asia, India, and southern China. It is a rare but regular wanderer to western Europe. There are also ~4 records from the Aleutian Islands of Alaska and a 2017 record from Labrador, Canada. The species winters in large flocks in cultivated areas, rice fields and grasslands, preferring to roost in rice-fields.

Breeding
The yellow-breasted bunting breeds in open scrubby areas that consist of dry water rice fields for foraging and reedbeds for roosting, often near water, and is present in Siberia. It lays four to six eggs in a nest on the ground. Its food consists of insects when feeding young, and otherwise seeds.

Conservation 
Populations have declined precipitously since the early 2000s, and the species is now considered to be critically endangered. The decline of the yellow-breasted bunting is likely to be caused by substantial trapping during migration and most specifically at winter sites. Birds are flushed then caught in mist-nets, to be sold for consumption as "sparrows" or "rice birds". Even though the actions have been restricted to a small area in southern China, it has become more widespread and popular to increasing wealth, and hunters now travel long distances to find sufficient birds. Shifts in rice paddy irrigation practices have reduced the quality and quantity of wintering habitats, including the loss of water stubble, and the loss of reedbeds has reduced available roost sites.

References

External links
OBC 24 photographs (see pulldown menu at page bottom)

yellow-breasted bunting
Birds of Russia
Birds of North Asia
yellow-breasted bunting